Kuluva Hospital, is a private, non-profit, community hospital in Uganda.

Location
The hospital is located in the village of Kuluva, a suburb of the city of Arua, in Arua District, West Nile sub-region, in Northern Uganda. The geographical coordinates of Kuluva Hospital are: 02°56'48.0"N, 30°55'57.0"E (Latitude:2.946667; Longitude:30.932500).

Overview
Kuluva Hospital is a non-profit, private, community hospital owned and administered by the Church of Uganda. A small fee is charged for medical services provided, although no one is turned away for lack of payment. The hospital is a member of the Uganda Protestant Medical Bureau.

Available literature suggests that it was founded in the early 20th century (circa 1902). In addition to serving patients from communities in the West Nile sub-region of Uganda, a significant percentage of the hospital patients come from the neighboring countries of the Democratic Republic of the Congo and South Sudan. The hospital has a bed capacity of 200, with several well-established departments including:

1. Outpatients Department 2. Pediatrics Department 3. Internal Medicine Department 4. Surgery Department 5. Obstetrics & Gynecology Department and 6. Nutritional Education & Rehabilitation Department.

See also
 Arua
 Arua District
 West Nile
 Northern Region, Uganda
 List of hospitals in Uganda

References

External links
 Determining Healthcare Workforce Requirements for Kuluva Hospital in West Nile-Uganda, using the Workload Indicators of Staffing Need (WISN) As of 29 April 2020.

Hospitals in Uganda
Arua
Arua District
West Nile sub-region
Northern Region, Uganda
Hospitals established in 1945
1945 establishments in Uganda